Aloha is a word in the Hawaiian language for love, affection, peace, compassion and mercy.

Aloha may also refer to:

Arts

Film and TV
 Aloha (1931 film), a 1931 American melodrama directed by Albert Rogell
 Aloha (2015 film), a 2015 American romantic comedy film written, produced and directed by Cameron Crowe
 "Aloha" (Hawaii Five-0), the series finale of the American television series Hawaii Five-0
 Aloha, a contestant on Real Chance of Love 2

Music

Performers
 Aloha (band), a band on Polyvinyl Record Co

Albums
 Aloha, a 1981 album by Henry Kaiser
 Aloha, a 1984 album by Italian band Pooh
 Aloha (album), a 2012 album by Todd Smith under the moniker El-Creepo!
 Aloha (EP), by Diarrhea Planet

Songs
 "Aloha", Glenn Miller And His Orchestra, The Royal Tahitians, etc., often referring to Aloha ʻOe
 "Aloha", single by Afric Simone	1976
 "Aloha", song by B. J. Thomas 1978
 "Aloha" (Fat Joe song), a song by Fat Joe
 "Aloha", a song by Møme

Businesses 
 Aloha Air Cargo
 Aloha Airlines
 Aloha Petroleum
 Aloha Yachts, a Canadian boat building company
 Island Air (Hawaii), formerly called Aloha IslandAir

Clothing 
 Aloha shirt
 Muumuu, also called an aloha dress

Computing 
 ALOHA protocol, a networking protocol designed around ALOHAnet
 ALOHAnet, an early computer networking system developed at the University of Hawaii

Places
 Aloha, Louisiana
 Aloha, Michigan
 Aloha, Oregon
 Aloha, Washington, a community in Grays Harbor County, Washington
 Aloha (crater), a lunar crater

Other uses 
 Aloha (planthopper), a genus of planthoppers
 ALOHA, Aboriginal Lands of Hawaiian Ancestry, a Hawaiian organization seeking reparations from the U.S. government
 Aloha Wanderwell (1906–1996), Canadian adventurer and filmmaker
 USS Aloha (SP-317), a US Navy patrol vessel in commission from 1917 to 1919
 Aloha-class freighter, a cargo ship design
 Operation Aloha (disambiguation)

See also 
 
 
 Aroha